The MRU Super League 2016 was the 12th season of MRU Super League, Malaysia's domestic rugby union competition. The kick off will begin on 23 January 2016. The final was held on 3 April 2016 and won by UPM Angels, 16 - 13 over defending champions, Keris Conlay. It was the first title that were achieved by the Angels in their history.

Teams

A total of 14 teams will compete in the 2016 season, increasing 2 teams from previous edition.

  Cobra RC
  NS Wanderers RC
  UPM Angels
  UiTM Lions
  ASAS RC
  Bandaraya Dragons RC
  KL Saracens
  Panthers Blowpipes
  Keris Conlay RC
  Iskandar Raiders
  JLJ Diraja
  SSTMI Tsunami
  Mersing Eagles
  Politeknik Merlimau

Season

In preliminary stage, all 14 teams were divided into 2 groups, and a single round-robin tournament was held by both groups.

Standings

Teams 1 to 4 (Green background) at the end of the preliminary competition rounds qualify for the final stage.
The lowest-placed teams (Red background) were relegated.

Grouping stage matches

Week 1

Week 2

Week 3

Week 4

Week 5

Week 6

Week 7

Final stage

Quarter-finals

Semi-Finals

Third placing

Final

See also

 MRU Super League

External links
Malaysia Rugby
Malaysia Rugby Union

2016
2016 rugby union tournaments for clubs